The Billboard Hot 100 is a chart that ranks the best-performing songs of the United States. Its data, published by Billboard magazine and compiled by Nielsen SoundScan, is based collectively on each single's weekly physical and digital sales, as well as airplay. Throughout 2012, a total of 12 singles claimed the number-one position. Although 13 singles topped the chart, singer Rihanna's "We Found Love", featuring Calvin Harris, had previously spent eight weeks atop the chart in late 2011, and thus excluded.

In 2012, six acts achieved their first US number-one single, either as a lead artist or a featured guest: Fun, Janelle Monáe, Gotye, Kimbra, Carly Rae Jepsen and Taylor Swift. Two collaboration singles topped the chart, "We Are Young" and "Somebody That I Used to Know". Throughout the year, no musical acts achieved multiple number-one singles. Gotye's "Somebody That I Used to Know", featuring Kimbra, became the year's biggest-selling single, topping the Billboard Year-End Hot 100.

Carly Rae Jepsen's "Call Me Maybe" and Maroon 5's "One More Night" tied for the longest-running number-one single of the year, both spending nine consecutive weeks atop the chart. Gotye's "Somebody That I Used to Know" was the second longest-running one, topping the Hot 100 for eight consecutive weeks. Both Fun's "We Are Young and Bruno Mars' "Locked Out of Heaven" spent a total of six weeks at number one, while Rihanna's "Diamonds", Kelly Clarkson's "Stronger (What Doesn't Kill You)" and Taylor Swift's "We Are Never Ever Getting Back Together", tied with three weeks atop the chart. "Diamonds" is Rihanna's twelfth Hot 100 number-one single, tying her with Madonna and The Supremes as the artists with the fifth-most number ones in the chart's history.

Chart history

Number-one artists

See also
2012 in American music
List of Billboard number-one singles
List of Billboard Hot 100 top 10 singles in 2012

Notes
A  Rihanna achieved two number-one singles in 2012, "We Found Love" and "Diamonds". However, the former was excluded from the count because it previously topped the Hot 100 in late 2011.
B  "Locked Out of Heaven" spent two weeks atop the Hot 100 in 2012 and four weeks in 2013. Combined, the single peaked at number one on the chart for a total of six weeks.

References

External links
Hot 100 chart at Billboard

United States Hot 100
2012
Hot 100 number-one singles